Mickola Vorokhta (born 18 July 1947 in Rakhiv, Ukraine) is a Ukrainian artist-painter who lives and works in Odessa. In 2014, he was awarded the status of Merited Artist of Ukraine.

Mickola Vorokhta finished his education in 1971 at the Art Faculty of Odessa Pedagogical Institute (maître V. G. Efimenko). From 1974 to 1998 he was a lecturer at the art department of Odessa State Academy of Civil Engineering and Architecture. Since 1995 he has been a member of the National Union of Ukrainian Artists.

His artworks are held in collections at the Culture Ministry of Ukraine, the Slovakian Museum of Ukrainian and Russian Culture, Historical Museum "Palanok", Odessa Museum of Western and Eastern Art and the Illichivsk Art Museum. They are also housed in private collections in Ukraine, Russia, UK, US, France, Japan, Switzerland, Norway, Italy, Portugal, Germany, China and other countries. He was the founder and head of the artist group "Zgurt" and was awarded а Diploma of Honor for his services to art and culture by the Odessa Regional Council.

Notes and references

Bibliography 
 https://web.archive.org/web/20160304110219/http://rakhiv-adm.org.ua/wp-content/uploads/2012/09/zr_53-54.pdf
 http://zakarpattya.net.ua/News/98157-U-Mukachevi-vidbulasia-personalna-vystavka-odeskykh-khudozhnykiv-FOTO
 http://www.japigia.com/dilloallarete.shtml?DA=eventi08

External links 
 Artist's personal web-site
 https://web.archive.org/web/20080620100319/http://w510.tm.odessa.ua/artgallery/vorohta/

1947 births
Living people
People from Zakarpattia Oblast
Ukrainian painters
Ukrainian male painters
Recipients of the title of Merited Artist of Ukraine